Summits On The Air (SOTA) is an amateur radio operating award program launched in Great Britain in 2002 by John Linford. The aim of SOTA is to encourage licensed amateur radio operators to operate temporarily from mountainous locations using any method of travel including hiking, mountain climbing, and cycling while operating their amateur radio station from the summits of hills and mountains. In addition to getting operators out into the field the program encourages others to listen in to the transmissions from these stations and send in reports. In areas that are not remote or difficult to access some SOTA activations serve as community outreach events. The program now has over 24,000 participants world wide, about 7,000 in the United States. Amateur radio operators who set up stations on mountain peaks are known as activators, and other amateur radio operators who complete contacts with them are called chasers. Points are given to both activators and chasers based on how high the mountain is. Awards are given based on accumulated points and certain special criteria. Amateur radio contacts between summits, referred to as summit-to-summit, are considered special achievements. Operators make use of a wide array of communication methods including morse code, voice (FM or SSB), and digital modes such as FT8. Although all parts of the amateur radio bands can be used to make contacts, setups and communication modes vary across operators based on equipment, environment and license class. Many operators use both VHF and HF to make contacts, as elevated locations allow increased line of sight. Contacts are also made using amateur radio satellites. The highest ever Summits on the Air activation reported was in February 2019 by Polish amateur radio operator Tom Rudzinski (SQ9FVE), who successfully operated from Aconcagua in Mendoza, Argentina.

Photos

See also 
 Parks On The Air

References

Amateur radio operating awards
Amateur radio
Amateur radio organizations